In the Name of... is an album by guitarist James Blood Ulmer's Music Revelation Ensemble, featuring bass guitarist Amin Ali and drummer Cornell Rochester, with guest saxophonists Sam Rivers, Arthur Blythe and Hamiet Bluiett, recorded in 1993 and released on the Japanese DIW label.

Reception

AllMusic reviewer Bret Love wrote, "The extremely busy soloing and dissonant arrangements may prove taxing for casual jazz fans, but In the Name Of... is sure to please fans of the free jazz sound". Critic Robert Christgau awarded the album an "A−".

Track listing
All compositions by James Blood Ulmer
 "In Time" – 8:10   
 "Non-Believer" – 10:38   
 "The Dawn" – 8:09   
 "Mankind" – 9:28   
 "Help" – 8:37   
 "Abundance" – 6:13   
 "Purity" – 7:49

Personnel
James Blood Ulmer – guitar
Amin Ali – electric bass
Cornell Rochester – drums
Sam Rivers – soprano saxophone (track 1), tenor saxophone (track 5), flute (track 4)
Arthur Blythe – alto saxophone (tracks 2, 6 & 7)
Hamiet Bluiett – baritone saxophone (track 3)

References 

1994 albums
James Blood Ulmer albums
DIW Records albums